Kwang-hwan is a Korean male given name.

People with this name include:
Jeon Kwang-hwan (born 1982), South Korean footballer
Lee Kwang-hwan, baseball manager for the LG Twins in 1992-1994

See also
List of Korean given names

References

Korean masculine given names